Mount Franklin is a mountain with an elevation of   in the Brindabella Ranges that is located on the border between the Australian Capital Territory and New South Wales, Australia. The summit of the mountain is located in the Australian Capital Territory.

The mountain is located in the Bimberi Nature Reserve and the Namadgi National Park. A marked walking trail to the summit can be  reached via Mount Franklin Road. The summit is accessible by bush walking trails and requires no specialised climbing skills. It is located close to Brindabella Station where the Australian author Miles Franklin once lived and the mountain is named after her family. The mountain is often covered in snow in winter and Australian ski pioneers based themselves at Mount Franklin from the 1930s. Nowadays, cross country skiing is possible in the area during winter, when conditions allow.

Skiing on Mount Franklin

A ski chalet was constructed at Mount Franklin in 1938 to service the Canberra Alpine Club. Ski runs were cleared and ski tows were improvised. The chalet later operated as a museum before being destroyed in the 2003 Canberra bushfires. A new shelter designed and built by University of Adelaide students opened in 2008. It serves as an interpretive centre and can provide park managers and emergency services personnel with a base to conduct search and rescue operations in the event of future bushfires. The ACT/NSW boundary passes through the Franklin Chalet ruin area.

Nowadays, cross country skiing is possible at Mount Franklin and surrounding peaks in winter, if conditions allow.

See also

List of mountains of Australia
Mount Ginini
Mount Gingera

References

External links 
Cycle Australia : Brindabell Cycle Tour

Mountains of the Australian Capital Territory
Borders of New South Wales
Borders of the Australian Capital Territory
Ski areas and resorts in the Australian Capital Territory
Brindabella Ranges